SS Snaefell (IV), the fourth ship in the company's history to be so named, was a packet steamer originally owned and operated by G. and J. Burns, who sold her to the Isle of Man Steam Packet Company in 1920.

Construction and dimensions
Originally named Viper built for the Irish Channel service between Scotland and Ireland, she was a steel; triple-screw turbine driven vessel. Viper was built at Govan by Fairfield Shipbuilding and Engineering Company, launched 10 March 1906.

The vessel's dimensions were a length of 315'; beam 39'6"; and depth 16'6". Vipers engines developed 6,500 i.h.p. which gave her a service speed of 21 knots. She had accommodation for 1,700 passengers and a crew of 61.

Viper was purchased by the Steam Packet on 22 March 1920 and renamed Snaefell. The consideration was £160,000.

Service life
Under her original owners, G. and J. Burns, Viper was employed on the company's Ardrossan-Belfast service. Purchased by the Isle of Man Steam Packet Company in 1920, she was renamed Snaefell, and served the numerous routes then operated by the company.

War service

First World War
Under her original owners, the vessel saw service in the First World War as a troopship. Little is known of her Great War service, but it is fair to assume she was used mainly for trooping duties between the Kent ports, Southampton and the main French port serving the British Expeditionary Force at Le Havre.

Second World War
At the outbreak of war, the Steam Packet operated a fleet comprising 16 ships. The Rushen Castle and Snaefell were kept to maintain the Isle of Man's vital link with the mainland, Snaefell primarily as a relief vessel.

Snaefell was again requisitioned and again used as a troopship, but after one year she was returned to the company and resumed her duty serving the Island's wartime link with the mainland, first to Liverpool and then to Fleetwood.

Post-war service
On the cessation of the war, Snaefell was withdrawn from service in 1945, and sold for breaking.

Disposal
After a life spanning 42 years, Snaefell was finally broken up in 1949. Its wooden staircase bannisters are now included within HQS Wellington in London.

Gallery

References

Bibliography
 Chappell, Connery (1980). Island Lifeline T.Stephenson & Sons Ltd 

Ships of the Isle of Man Steam Packet Company
1906 ships
Steamships of the United Kingdom